The green-thighed frog (Nyctimystes brevipalmatus) is a  species of tree frog in the subfamily Pelodryadinae. Members of this species are medium-sized, ground-dwelling frogs, and are found in Australia.

Distribution
The green-thighed frog is native to the east coast of Australia. Its range stretches from Cordalba State Forest in south-eastern Queensland to Ourimbah in New South Wales; within this area, though, populations are severely fragmented. The several records from Darkes Forest, south of Sydney, are erroneous. Numbers have decreased at Ourimbah, but there have been no record of declines or disappearances elsewhere. They are believed to occupy an area of less than 500 km2; this has led to them being listed as endangered on the IUCN RedList of Threatened Species

Description
The dorsal surface is chocolate brown with darker flecks. The ventral surface is white or pale yellow and peppered with fine dark spots over the throat. A thick stripe runs from the snout, across the eye and tympanum, and then breaks up into blotches on the sides. The margin of the upper jaw is marked with white; this stripe continues to the base of the arm. The armpits are marked with lime green or yellow. The backs of the thighs and groin are bright blue, green, or blue-green, with black mottling. The tympanum is distinct, and finger and toe pads are medium-sized. The fingers don't web and the toes are one-third webbed. The iris is dark brown with a golden crescent in the upper half. The legs are shorter compared to other ground-dwelling hylids.

Ecology and behaviour
It inhabits areas of rainforest, wet sclerophyll, and open forests. Breeding occurs from September to May after heavy rain. From 300 to 600 eggs are deposited in temporary pools and flooded areas, and are laid in clumps among water weeds at the water's surface.

Similar species
Green-thighed frogs are unlikely to be confused with any other species because of the bright colours in the groin and on the thighs and the lack of toe webbing.

References
Barker, J.; Grigg, G.C.; Tyler,M.J. (1995). A Field Guide to Australian Frogs. Surrey Beatty & Sons.
Frogs Australia Network - Litoria brevipalmata - call available here
Litoria brevipalmata (Accessed 2006/08/25)

Nyctimystes
Amphibians of Queensland
Amphibians of New South Wales
Endangered fauna of Australia
Amphibians described in 1972
Frogs of Australia